= Urabaito: Tōbō Kinshi =

Japanese manga series

- First tankōbon volume cover

裏バイト：逃亡禁止
- Genre: Horror
- Manga
- Written by: Shōtarō Taguchi
- Published by: Shogakukan
- Imprint: Ura Sunday Comics
- Magazine: MangaONE; Ura Sunday
- Original run: January 4, 2020 – August 29, 2026
- Volumes: 20

Urabaito: Tōbō Kinshi (裏バイト：逃亡禁止) is a Japanese manga series written and illustrated by Shōtarō Taguchi. It was serialized on Shogakukan's MangaONE and Ura Sunday manga websites from January 2020 to August 2026.

== Synopsis ==
Yume Kokuryo and Nagomi Shirahama are a pair of women seeking a large sum of money for certain reasons. They work a secret part-time job that involves their lives being threatened by monsters and humans.

== Publication ==
Written and illustrated by Shōtarō Taguchi, Urabaito: Tōbō Kinshi was serialized on Shogakukan's MangaONE and Ura Sunday manga websites from January 4, 2020 to August 29, 2026. Its chapters have been compiled into twenty tankōbon volumes as of October 2026.

No.	Release date	ISBN
1	June 18, 2020	978-4-09-850147-2
2	November 12, 2020	978-4-09-850333-9
3	February 19, 2021	978-4-09-850461-9
4	June 17, 2021	978-4-09-850600-2
5	October 12, 2021	978-4-09-850751-1
6	February 10, 2022	978-4-09-850889-1
7	June 10, 2022	978-4-09-851160-0
8	November 10, 2022	978-4-09-851400-7
9	March 10, 2023	978-4-09-851747-3
10	July 19, 2023	978-4-09-852554-6
11	December 12, 2023	978-4-09-853057-1
12	April 11, 2024	978-4-09-853206-3
13	July 11, 2024	978-4-09-853439-5
14	November 12, 2024	978-4-09-853697-9
15	February 12, 2025	978-4-09-853860-7
16	June 12, 2025	978-4-09-854135-5
17	November 12, 2025	978-4-09-854306-9
18	March 12, 2026	978-4-09-854348-9
19	August 10, 2026	978-4-09-854726-5
20	October 9, 2026	978-4-09-854853-8

== Reception ==
The series was nominated for the seventh Next Manga Awards in 2021 in the web category and was ranked fifth.
